Alfred Jacob Miller (January 2, 1810 – June 26, 1874) was an American artist best known for his paintings of trappers and Native Americans in the fur trade of the western United States. He also painted numerous portraits and genre paintings in and around Baltimore during the mid-nineteenth century.

Life
Miller was born in Baltimore, Maryland, the eldest of nine children of George W. and Harriet J. Miller. Miller's father was a merchant and tavern keeper in central Baltimore, and also had a farm in Hawkins Point. Miller attended a private school in Baltimore, John D. Craig's Academy, but did not receive formal art instruction there. He may have received his first lessons in art from Thomas Sully. In 1832, with the financial support of his family and art patrons in Baltimore, Miller traveled to Paris to study art. He was admitted as an auditor to life drawing classes at the École des Beaux-Arts, and copied paintings in the collections of the Louvre. In 1833, he traveled to Italy, visiting Bologna, Florence, and Venice before settling in Rome, where he studies at the English Life School. During his travels in Europe, he became friends with the Danish sculptor Bertel Thorwaldsen and studied with the French painter Horace Vernet.

He returned to Baltimore in 1834, where he opened a downtown studio and advertised himself as a painter of portraits and Old Master copies. Professional and financial difficulties may have prompted his decision to move to New Orleans in 1837. The city was a relatively open market for artists, and Miller quickly established a studio on Chartes Street and began receiving orders for portraits. It was in his studio that he met the Scottish aristocrat and adventurer, Sir William Drummond Stewart.

Stewart hired Miller to accompany him and record his hunting journey to the Rocky Mountains. That same year, along with representatives of the American Fur Company, they ventured as far as Fort William and Green River.

After returning to New Orleans later that year, Miller started working up his sketches in watercolors and oils. The scenes and incidents of the hunting journey were the foundation of a series of paintings documenting Native Americans of the United States.  In July 1838 Miller was able to arrange an exhibition in New Orleans. In October 1840 he traveled with his paintings to Stewart's Murthly Castle in Scotland, where a collection of his commissioned work was ultimately hung.

After spending a year in Scotland and another in London, Miller returned to Baltimore in April 1842. He established himself as an acknowledged portrait artist in the city. He died on June 26, 1874.

Paintings

Notes

References
Miller's Biographical Note

External links

 
 Alfred Jacob Miller manuscript and sketches, (undated and 1837 from the Archives of American Art
 William Drummond Stewart biography at 3rd1000.com
American paintings & historical prints from the Middendorf collection, an exhibition catalog from The Metropolitan Museum of Art (fully available online as PDF), which contains material on Miller (no. 21)

1810 births
1874 deaths
19th-century American painters
American male painters
People of the American Old West
Artists from Baltimore
Painters from Maryland
American portrait painters
American landscape painters
19th-century American male artists